John Jagger may refer to:
 John Jagger (MP), British trade unionist and politician
 John Jagger (ice hockey), Canadian ice hockey player
 John William Jagger, South African businessman and politician